Colette Marino (born May 27, 1975, in Chicago, Illinois), known as DJ Colette or simply as Colette, is a house music DJ and vocalist from Chicago, Illinois. She is a resident DJ at the SmartBar in Chicago, Illinois (along with Kaskade and others). She first gained attention when she started singing over her mixes as DJ.

Biography
She started DJing in the early 1990s. In 1997, she helped form the all-female DJ group SuperJane with DJ Heather, DJ Dayhota, and Lady D.

During the preparations for her album Push, she married actor/rock musician Thomas Ian Nicholas in 2007. They have two children, a son born in 2011, and a daughter, born in April 2016. 

In 2003, she was, along with Paul Van Dyk and Felix da Housecat, chosen to advertise Motorola's cellular phones. Her song used in this commercial would go on to win Dancestar's Best Song Used in a Commercial for Motorola. She also received "Best Breakthrough DJ" award.

Her album Hypnotized was the most downloaded house dance album on Apple's iTunes Music Store in June 2005. Her song What Will She Do for Love from this album was a Billboard No. 1 Dance Club Play Single. The title track, Hypnotized, was licensed to the movie The Devil Wears Prada for the soundtrack.

She hosted Lancaster, California radio station KVVS's show, Maximum Rotation.

She has performed all over the world, including, Detroit, Michigan, Cambridge, Singapore, Calgary, Hollywood, Montreal, and Omaha.

She has been compared to Kylie Minogue and Deborah Harry. She's also been called Om Records' First Lady of House.

In 2013, she released her third Album, "When The Music's Loud". The album featuring influences of Italo disco and Electro. The record received favorable reviews from Spin, Pitchfork and Slant. The album, which was recorded in Williamsburg, Brooklyn and Los Angeles featured production of producer Tim K, who helped her develop the record with her over a three-year span. The record also featured the production of Santiago & Bushido, Nick Chacona and DJ Teenwolf. A studio tour in late 2012 revealed Colette recorded the vocals for the album on a Peluso P-12 and through a vintage recording chain. Sonically, the album made frequent use of Vocoders and Talk Boxes. The album featured a sample of Trax Records artist Adonis, on the second single "Hotwire". The album release date was August 27, 2013. The record was made entirely without live musical instruments.

In December 2013, Billboard named Colette's album "When The Music's Loud" one of the top 20 Dance Music Albums of 2013.

In May 2022, Colette filed for divorce from Thomas Ian Nicholas.

Chart performance

Discography

Albums
 Hypnotized (2005)
 Push (2007)
 When The Music's Loud (2013)
 Retrospective (2017)

Singles and EPs
 "Moments of Epiphany" (1995)
 "Keep On Groovin'" (1996)
 Try Her For Love (2000)
 Find Your Love (2000)
 Innocent (2001)
 Sexuality (2002)
 Do You Want Me (2002)
 Keep It Down (2004)
 Our Day/Smile For Me (2004)
 Didn't Mean To Turn You On (2005)
 What Will She Do For Love (2005)
 Feelin' Hypnotized (2005)
 "House of OM" (2006)
 "About Us" (2007)
 "If" (2007)
 "Stay" (2008)
 "Make Me Feel" (2009)
 "Think You Want It" (2009)
 "UR Everything" (2010)
 "Call On Me" (2010)
 "On A High" (2010)
 "Give Something" (2011)
 "Crush" (2012)
 "Crush 2" (2012)
 "Hotwire" (2013)
 "Physically" (2014)

Mix compilations
 "In The Sun" (2000)
 "Our Day" (2001)
 "House of OM" (2006)

References

External links
 

1975 births
21st-century American singers
21st-century American women singers
American dance musicians
American DJs
American women DJs
American women singer-songwriters
American house musicians
American mezzo-sopranos
American women in electronic music
Deep house musicians
Electronic dance music DJs
Living people
Singers from Chicago
Singer-songwriters from Illinois